Ultimate Force is a British television action drama series that was shown on ITV, which deals with the activities of Red Troop of the SAS (Special Air Service). The first episode was broadcast on 16 September 2002, and a total of four series were produced. The series starred Ross Kemp as central character Staff Sergeant Henry 'Henno' Garvie. The show was initially described as a star vehicle for Kemp, who had been lured away from the BBC to ITV with a multimillion-pound contract. Kemp appeared in every episode of the four series. 

The series was co-created by Chris Ryan, a former British SAS soldier who was a member of the famous Bravo Two Zero patrol during the 1991 Gulf War. The series was produced by Bentley Productions.

Background
As well as his behind the scenes role, creator Chris Ryan appeared in the first series of the show playing Blue Troop leader Johnny Bell. 

A number of the cast featuring in the first two series did not return to appear in the third series, resulting in a change of characters.

Domestically, the change of format seemed to produce diminishing returns for ITV. The third series was abruptly taken off air by the network midway through the run, only to return a few weeks later. The show was then moved to Saturday evenings at 9 p.m. A similar fate awaited series four, which was pulled after just two episodes. The three remaining episodes of the fourth series were not originally shown on ITV, but shown on ITV4, in January and February 2007. ITV showed the remaining three episodes of the series over a year later, starting on 18 May 2008. The DVD of the fourth series had previously been released on 25 September 2006. ITV then announced there would not be a fifth series, partially due to low ratings—hence the cutting of series three and four midway through their runs—whilst many of the stars moved onto other projects. 

Ross Kemp went on to host a series of documentaries following the progress of British Army troops in Afghanistan, whilst both Sam Callis and Christopher Fox joined ITV's police serial drama The Bill portraying both Sgt Callum Stone and DS Max Carter respectively from 2007 to the end of 2010. Notably, a large number of plotlines throughout the series were left unanswered: most notably, the killing of Iain Macalwain by Henno, the conflict in Pete Twamley's marriage, and the murder of Jamie Dow's step dad, who is hinted to have been killed by Ricky Mann. DVD sales of the first two series resulted in more than £700,000 of revenue by the arrival of the third series, with both regular and limited edition sets making the top ten of the television sales charts. The series has also been aired in 120 countries, ranging from Europe to Southeast Asia.

Cast

Red Troop
 Ross Kemp as Staff Sergeant Henry-George 'Henno' Garvie; Red Troop SNCO and the only character to appear in every episode.
 Christopher Fox as Corporal Louis Hoffman (Series 1, Episode 3; Series 2–4); passes selection in Episode 3 of Series 1, and becomes a main character from Series 2 onwards.
 Jamie Draven as Trooper Jamie Dow (Series 1–2); K.I.A. at the start of Series 3. Draven did not return for Series 3, a body double was used for the death scene.
 Tony Curran as Corporal/Sergeant Pete Twamley (Series 1–2); K.I.A. at the start of Series 3. Curran did not return for Series 3, a body double was used for the death scene.
 Danny Sapani as Corporal Ricky Mann (Series 1–2); K.I.A. at the start of Series 3. Sapani did not return for Series 3, a body double was used for the death scene.
 Heather Peace as Trooper Becca Gallagher (Series 3–4); passes selection in Series 3, and joins Red Troop for the remainder of the series.
 Louis Decosta Johnson as Corporal Dave Woolston (Series 3–4); Joins Red Troop in Series 3, and stays for the remainder of the series.
 Elliot Cowan as Lance Corporal Jem Poynton (Series 1 – Series 2, Episode 1); K.I.A. in a shoot out with French special forces in Series 2.
 Sendhil Ramamurthy as Trooper Alex Leonard (Series 1); leaves the army at the end of Series 1, partly due to the death of his brother.
 Liam Garrigan as Corporal Ed Dwyer (Series 3); passes selection in Series 3 and joins Red Troop. K.I.A between Series 3 and 4 in unknown incident, buried at the start of Series 4.
 Jamie Michie as Corporal Finn Younger (Series 4); Joins Red Troop at the start of Series 4.

Officers
 Miles Anderson as Colonel Aidan Dempsey; Commanding Officer of 22 Regiment, and the only character other than Garvie and Hoffman to appear in all four series.
 Alex Reid as Captain Caroline Walshe (Series 1–2); Reid did not return for Series 3, the character was supposedly reassigned by Dempsey.
 Jamie Bamber as Captain Dennis "Dotsy" Doheny (Series 1–2); Resigns to take the fall for the incident with French special forces in Series 2.
 Richard Armitage as Captain Ian Macalwain (Series 2); Replacement Red Troop Commander who was killed by Garvie at the end of Series 2.
 Sam Callis as Captain Patrick Fleming (Series 4); Red Troop Commander in Series 4.

Attache
 Tobias Menzies as Box 500 (Series 1); MI5 Attache in the first series.
 Lucy Akhurst as Pru Banks (Series 2); MI5 Attache in the second series, replacing Box 500.
 Hannah Yelland as Kathy Crampton (Series 3); MI5 Attache in the third series, replacing Pru Banks.

Minor characters
 Chris Ryan as Staff Sergeant Johnny Bell (Series 1); head of Blue Troop (SNCO)
 Derek Horne as Sergeant Sean Smith (Series 2–3); head of Blue Troop (SNCO)
 Anthony Howell as Trooper Sam Leonard (Series 1); member of Red Troop K.I.A. in the first episode.
 Laurence Fox as Corporal Mick Sharp (Series 1); passes selection, and later joins Red Troop in the final episode of the series.
 Jackie Morrison as Laura Twamley (Series 1–2); long suffering wife of Pete Twamley.
 Liz White as Beth Dow; Sister of Jamie Dow
 Paul Brightwell	- Konchalovsky
 Richard Klvac -	Tarkovsky
 Goran Kostic - Pudovkin
 Valentine Pelka -	Bundarczuk
 Julian Rivett -	Klimov
 Igor Urdenko - Mikhailov
 Adam Fogerty - Taras Rustum

Episode list

Series 1 (2002)

Series 2 (2003)

Series 3 (2005)

Series 4 (2006)

Broadcasters

1 Originally aired on the Nine Network, though sporadically. Only the first four episodes of Series 1 aired. The Seven Network then bought the rights to show Ultimate Force, but started at Series 2. Series 2 episodes were shown on the weekly schedule of Wednesday at 10:30 p.m.
2 Title means S.A.S.: British Special Forces.
3 Also being aired on the UK.TV channel via Australian Pay TV networks.
4 With slight changes in the episodes' order, due to French TV regulation for youth protection: some episodes considered as too violent and can't be aired before 10:00pm. E.g. Series 3, Episode 2 has been aired in the middle of Series 1, at 10:45 p.m. after two episodes of Series 1.

See also

British Military dramas:
 Soldier Soldier
 Red Cap
 Spearhead
 Our Girl

US Military dramas:
 The Brave (TV series) — Similar type of series but focused on a fictional Defense Intelligence Agency unit
 SEAL Team (TV series) — Similar type of series but focused on the United States Navy SEALs
 Six (TV series) — Similar type of series but focused on the United States Navy SEALs
 The Unit — Similar type of series but focused on the United States Army's Delta Force

References

Further reading 
 Diana Harris, Ultimate Force, Batsford Books, 2002,

External links

2002 British television series debuts
2008 British television series endings
2000s British drama television series
British action television series
English-language television shows
ITV television dramas
British military television series
Television series by All3Media
Television shows set in Hertfordshire
Works about the Special Air Service